The swimming competitions at the 2001 Southeast Asian Games in Kuala Lumpur took place from 10 to 18 September 2001 at the National Aquatics Centre within the National Sports Complex. It was one of four aquatic sports at the Games, along with swimming, water polo and synchronised swimming.

Medalist
Men's events

Women's events

References

2001 Southeast Asian Games events
Southeast Asian Games
2001